Ben Franklin is an unincorporated community in Delta County, Texas, United States, four miles (6 km) northeast of Pecan Gap and 77 miles (124 km) northeast of Dallas. The town's ZIP Code is 75415.

The settlement was located on Benjamin Simmons' land grant and named for his son, Benjamin Franklin Simmons. The Simmons family, along with the Birdwells and Hogues, arrived in the area in 1835 and were among the first settlers.

Rise of the town
The first post office was established in 1853. The next year, a Methodist Episcopal church was established. The first school in the settlement was probably established shortly after the American Civil War.

By 1884 Ben Franklin had a population of 200 and thrice-weekly mail service. Cotton ginning and shipment were the major businesses, but others included three sawmills, a shingle manufacturer, two flour mills, and a feed mill. The town also had three general stores, the McGinnis and Company saloon, a restaurant, an apothecary shop, and a blacksmith shop.

The Gulf, Colorado and Santa Fe Railway built a track just north of Ben Franklin in 1886, and the settlement became a stop on the line by 1889. In 1890 it had a population of 1,000, two hotels, two livery stables, and a telegraph office. John McFall had opened a grocery, and P. H. Snodgrass worked as a sign painter. Citizens could attend new Baptist, Christian, and Adventist churches. In 1892 Ben Franklin supported two new hotels, a doctor had opened an office, and a barber had moved to town.

Decline and near desertion of the town
In 1895 the Texas-Midland Railroad built through Cooper, the county seat, and drew much of the traffic from Ben Franklin. By 1904 the population had decreased to 343. In 1912 only two businesses remained. Records for 1918 indicated two segregated schools. The town had 300 people and no businesses in 1925.

However, by 1929 it had had a slight revival with 500 residents and a bank. By 1936 the railway through town had become part of the Gulf, Colorado and Santa Fe system, and the town had seven businesses, a school, three churches, and a population of 300. In 1945 rapidly declining Ben Franklin had 250 residents and seven businesses.

In 1964 Ben Franklin had a water tank, two churches, two cemeteries, one business, the post office, and 150 inhabitants. Six years later there was a Ben Franklin Community Center. The only business in 1976 was Fremman's Grocery. In 1990 the community had seventy-five residents.

External links
 
Map: 

Unincorporated communities in Delta County, Texas
Unincorporated communities in Texas